Jazz Mad is a 1928 American silent drama film directed by F. Harmon Weight and starring Jean Hersholt, Marian Nixon, and George J. Lewis. It was produced and released by Universal Pictures.

Cast
Jean Hersholt as Franz Hausmann
Marian Nixon as Elsa Hausmann
George J. Lewis as Leopold Ostberg
Roscoe Karns as Sol Levy
Torben Meyer as Kline
Andrew Arbuckle as Schmidt
Charles Clary as Mr. Ostberg
Clarissa Selwynne as Mrs. Ostberg
Patricia Caron as Miss Ostberg
Alfred Hertz as Symphony Conductor
Virginia Grey (uncredited)

Preservation status
A copy of Jazz Mad is preserved by the Library of Congress Packard Campus and the UCLA Film and Television Archive.

References

External links

1928 films
American silent feature films
Universal Pictures films
American black-and-white films
Silent American drama films
1928 drama films
Films directed by F. Harmon Weight
1920s American films